Moorbrock Hill is a hill in the Carsphairn and Scaur Hills range, part of the Southern Uplands of Scotland. Although frequently climbed on its own from Craigengillan to the south, it is also often part of a round of the neighbouring hills.

References

Mountains and hills of the Southern Uplands
Mountains and hills of Dumfries and Galloway
Donald mountains